Mitchell Aubusson (born 1 October 1987) is a former Australian professional rugby league footballer who played as a  and , spending his entire career with the Sydney Roosters in the National Rugby League (NRL). He won three NRL premierships with the Roosters in 2013, 2018 and 2019. He has also played for NSW Country at representative level.

Background
Aubusson was born in Sydney, New South Wales, Australia.

While attending Xavier Catholic College Ballina in 2005, Aubusson played for the Australian Schoolboys team.

He is the younger brother of James Aubusson, who also played for the Sydney Roosters.

Career
Aubusson played in the 2006 NSW Cup grand final for Newtown, who were the feeder club for the Sydney Roosters at the time.  Newtown would lose the final 20-19 against Parramatta at Stadium Australia.

Aubusson made his first grade debut for the Sydney Roosters in round 1 of the 2007 NRL season against archrivals South Sydney at the Sydney Football Stadium.  In the 2008 NRL season, Aubusson was part of the Sydney Roosters side which qualified for the finals but were eliminated by the New Zealand Warriors.

In the 2009 NRL season, Aubusson played 17 games as the club finished last on the table for the first time since 1966.

Aubusson played in the 2010 NRL Grand Final, against St. George Illawarra scoring a try in the Roosters' 32–8 loss.

Aubusson also played for the Sydney Roosters in the 2013 NRL Grand Final against Manly which the Roosters won 26–18. Early in the second half Aubusson tackled Jamie Lyon without the ball, giving Manly a penalty try.

Aubusson was part of the Roosters' sides who won 3 consecutive minor premierships in 2013, 2014 and 2015 but failed to reach the grand final in the latter two seasons. In 2017, Aubusson made 25 appearances for the club as the Roosters made the preliminary final but fell short of a grand final appearance losing to North Queensland 29–16. In 2018, Aubusson was part of the side that won its fourth Minor Premiership in six years. Aubusson then played in the 2018 NRL Grand Final in which the Sydney Roosters defeated Melbourne 21-6 winning their 14th premiership and Aubusson's second.

In round 4 of the 2019 NRL season, Aubusson scored 2 tries as the Roosters defeated Brisbane 36–4 at the Sydney Cricket Ground. On 19 August 2019, Aubusson signed a one-year contract extension with the Roosters, through to the end of 2020.
Aubusson played in the club's 2019 NRL Grand Final victory over Canberra at ANZ Stadium. Aubusson only played 12 minutes of the game before he was taken from the field with a knee injury. It was Aubusson's third premiership victory as a player.
In round 13 of the 2020 NRL season, Aubusson became the third Sydney Roosters player to play 300 games. Aubusson celebrated by scoring a try in his team's 24–16 victory over St. George at WIN Stadium.
On 24 August 2020, Aubusson announced his retirement from rugby league for the end of the 2020 season.

On 19 September 2020, Aubusson played his 303rd first grade game becoming the most capped Sydney Roosters player overtaking Anthony Minichiello who played 302, Aubusson scored a double in the 34-18 victory over Cronulla-Sutherland at the Sydney Cricket Ground.

On 9 October 2020, Aubusson played his 306th and final game in his sides 18-22 loss to the Canberra Raiders at the Sydney Cricket Ground in week two of the finals, the Roosters were eliminated from the finals after also losing to the Penrith Panthers one week earlier.

References

External links
Sydney Roosters profile
Roosters profile
NRL player profile

1987 births
Living people
Ballina Seagulls players
Country New South Wales Origin rugby league team players
Newtown Jets NSW Cup players
NRL All Stars players
Rugby league centres
Rugby league five-eighths
Rugby league locks
Rugby league players from Sydney
Rugby league second-rows
Sydney Roosters players